Searose Beach is an unincorporated community in Lane County, Oregon, United States.  It lies along U.S. Route 101, near the Pacific Ocean.

Oregon Coast
Unincorporated communities in Lane County, Oregon
Unincorporated communities in Oregon
Populated coastal places in Oregon